Kyonpaw is a village in Ye Township in the Mon State of south-east Burma. It is located 3 miles north-west of Ye city.

Nearby towns and villages include Zayat (3.9 nm), Hnyihnu (4.0 nm), Zuntalin (4.1 nm), Webaw (2.2 nm), Tumyaung (1.9 nm) and Abaw (3.6 nm).

Populated places in Mon State